Jazzmatazz Volume 1 (An Experimental Fusion of Hip-Hop and Jazz) is the debut solo studio album by American hip hop recording artist Guru. It was released on May 18, 1993, through Chrysalis Records. Recording sessions took place at D&D Studios in New York. Production was handled by Guru himself, who also served as executive producer together with Duff Marlowe and Patrick Moxey.

The album combines a live jazz band performance with hip hop production and rapping. It features contributions from singers N'Dea Davenport, Carleen Anderson, Dee C Lee, French rapper MC Solaar, and musicians Simon Law, Branford Marsalis, Courtney Pine, Donald Byrd, Gary Barnacle, Lonnie Liston Smith, Ronny Jordan, Roy Ayers and Zachary Breaux.

Guru, quoted in the album's liner notes, talked about his natural affinity for both jazz and rap. "Jazz's mellow tracks, along with the hard rap beat, go hand-in-glove with my voice", he said.

The album made it to number 94 on the Billboard 200 and number 15 on the Top R&B/Hip-Hop Albums in the United States. In spite of the lagging American sales, Jazzmatazz, Vol. 1 was a commercial success in Europe, where jazz was much more popular in the 1990s. It peaked at No. 24 in New Zealand, No. 43 in Germany, No. 49 in Sweden, No. 58 in the UK, No. 67 in the Netherlands, and No. 139 in France. Its lead single "Trust Me" peaked at No. 34 on the UK Singles Chart and No. 105 on the US Billboard Hot 100. Its second single, "No Time to Play", peaked at No. 25 in the UK. SPIN ranked the album at number 20 on their 'The 20 Best Albums of 1993' list.

Track listing

Notes
 signifies a co-producer.

Personnel
Credits adapted from liner notes.

Musicians

 Keith "GuRu" Elam – vocals, arrangement
 N'Dea Davenport – vocals (tracks: 3, 9)
 Diane "Dee C Lee" Sealy – vocals (track 5)
 Claude "MC Solaar" M'Barali – vocals (track 11)
 Carleen Anderson – vocals (track 12)
 Cary "Big Shug" Guy – additional vocals (track 5)
 The Cutthroats – additional vocals (track 10)
 Black Jack – additional vocals (track 11)
 Mickey "Mus Mus" Mosman – additional vocals (track 11)
 Donald Byrd – trumpet and piano (track 2)
 Simon "The Funky Ginger" Law – keyboards (tracks: 3, 12)
 Branford Marsalis – alto and soprano saxophone (track 4)
 Zachary Breaux – guitar (track 4)
 DJ Jazzy Nice – scratches (track 4)
 Robert "Ronny Jordan" Simpson – guitar (track 5)
 Lonnie Liston Smith – acoustic and electric piano (track 6)
 James "Lil' Dap" Heath – live drums (track 6)
 Roy Ayers – vibraslap and vibraphone (track 8)
 Gary Barnacle – flute and saxophone (track 10)
 Christophe "Jimmy Jay" Viguier – scratches (track 11)
 Courtney Pine – flute, alto and soprano saxophone (track 12)

Production

 Guru – producer, mixing, executive producer, concept development
 Donald Byrd – co-producer (track 2)
 N'Dea Davenport – co-producer (tracks: 3, 9)
 Branford Marsalis – co-producer (track 4)
 Ronny Jordan – co-producer (track 5)
 Lonnie Liston Smith – co-producer (track 6)
 Roy Ayers – co-producer (track 8)
 DJ Jimmy Jay – co-producer (track 11)
 MC Solaar – co-producer (track 11)
 Courtney Pine – co-producer (track 12)
 Carleen Anderson – co-producer (track 12)
 Philippe "Zdar" Cerboneschi – engineering
 James B. Mansfield – engineering
 Craig Marcus – engineering
 Kieran Walsh – engineering
 Jason Bell – engineering
 Joe Quinde – engineering
 Luke Allen – engineering assistant
 Doug Boehm – engineering assistant
 David Carpenter – engineering assistant
 Tracii D. Sherman – engineering assistant
 Tony Dawsey – mastering
 Patrick Moxey – executive producer, concept development
 Duff Marlowe – executive producer

Design
 Henry Marquez – art direction
 Diane Cuddy – design
 Michael Benabib – photography
 Marc Villalonga – photography
 Ray Burmiston – photography
 Bill Adler – liner notes

Charts

Weekly charts

Year-end charts

References

External links

1993 debut albums
Guru (rapper) albums
Albums produced by Guru
Chrysalis Records albums